Etta Lee (September 12, 1906 – October 27, 1956) was an American silent film actress, known for supporting roles.

Early life
Lee was born on September 12, 1906, in Kauai, Hawaii. Her father was a Chinese medical doctor and her mother was of French ancestry. She grew up in California and went on to get her degree in education at Occidental College in Los Angeles. Lee moved back to Hawaii to be a teacher, before returning to Los Angeles to begin her career as an actress.

Career 
Lee's first film was A Tale of Two Worlds in 1921, where she played Ah Fah, a Chinese maid.  She played another Chinese maid named Liu in the 1923 film The Remittance Woman, a maid in The Untameable (1923), A Thief in Paradise (1925), The Trouble with Wives (1925), and International House (1933). Other so-called exotic roles she was cast in included The Slave of the Sand Board in The Thief of Bagdad (1924).  In 1923, she was called the only Eurasian girl in films.

Lee directly commented on the lack of diversity in her roles in an article in 1924. She noted that "I am equipped…to show oriental impulse and emotional complexities. But in this field I have not yet had opportunity." She went on to discuss that even in terms of getting roles meant for Chinese women, she was often turned down because she was of mixed race and did not look Chinese enough.

She made her first stage debut in the summer of 1927, with a production of The Scarlet Virgin in Los Angeles.

Personal life 
In 1932, Lee married Frank Robinson Brown, a Welsh-born radio announcer and columnist, and retired from acting afterward. She became active in her community following retirement, becoming chairwoman of the Eureka Woman's Club. She was also an active member of the Episcopal Church. 

Lee died at age 50 on October 27, 1956, at her home in Eureka, California.

Filmography

Film

References

External links

1906 births
1956 deaths
Occidental College alumni
American silent film actresses
20th-century American actresses
Actresses from Hawaii
Actresses from Los Angeles